Agyneta serratichelis is a species of sheet weaver spider found in Sudan. It was described by Jacques Denis in 1964.

References

Endemic fauna of Sudan
serratichelis
Fauna of Sudan
Spiders of Africa
Spiders described in 1964